Ashley Creek is a stream in the U.S. state of Montana. It is a tributary to the Flathead River.

Ashley Creek was named after an early settler.

References

Rivers of Montana
Rivers of Flathead County, Montana